Vinícius Henrique Baracioli Maciel (born 17 April 2000), known as Vinícius Baracioli is a Brazilian footballer who plays for Barra-SC, on loan of Mirassol as a right back.

Career statistics

Honours
Mirassol
 Campeonato Brasileiro Série D: 2020

References

External links

2000 births
Living people
Brazilian footballers
Association football defenders
Campeonato Brasileiro Série C players
Campeonato Brasileiro Série D players
Mirassol Futebol Clube players